Isaac J. Winograd is an American geologist and an Elected Fellow of the American Association for the Advancement of Science.

References

Year of birth missing (living people)
Living people
Fellows of the American Association for the Advancement of Science
American geologists
Place of birth missing (living people)